Splash Mountain is a log flume ride at Disneyland and Tokyo Disneyland. It was formerly located in Walt Disney World's Magic Kingdom before closing in January 2023. The ride is based on the animated sequences of the 1946 Disney film Song of the South. Although there are variations in the story and features between the two locations, each installation begins with a peaceful outdoor float-through that leads to indoor dark ride segments, with a climactic steep drop into a "briar patch" followed by an indoor finale.

In June 2020, it was announced that the U.S. versions of the ride would be receiving a new theme based on Disney's 2009 film The Princess and the Frog. The new ride, which will be titled Tiana's Bayou Adventure, is scheduled to open at Disneyland and Magic Kingdom in late 2024. The Magic Kingdom version of Splash Mountain closed on January 23, 2023. The closing date for the Disneyland version has yet to be announced.

Story
The plot behind Splash Mountain is a composite of several Uncle Remus stories as taken from the animated segments of the film Song of the South. The two versions of the attraction feature similar stories, albeit with small differences, and tell the story of Br'er Rabbit, a mischievous character who leaves his home in search of adventure. Br'er Fox and Br'er Bear, the antagonists of the story, are determined to catch him but are repeatedly tricked by Br'er Rabbit into letting him free. The sharp-witted Br'er Rabbit avoids a snare trap (as described in "Br'er Rabbit Earns a Dollar a Minute") and uses it to trap Br'er Bear instead. Br'er Rabbit continues on his journey to find his "laughing place". Out of curiosity, his foes follow only for Br'er Rabbit to lead them into a cavern of bees. Br'er Fox eventually catches Br’er Rabbit and threatens to eat him. Br'er Rabbit uses reverse psychology on Br'er Fox, begging him not to throw him into the briar patch (as described in "The Tar Baby"). Br'er Fox then throws Br'er Rabbit into the briar patch (represented by the ride's flume drop); Br'er Rabbit escapes uninjured. Br'er Rabbit resolves to remain at his longstanding home in the briar patch while the other animals rejoice at his return and Br'er Fox and Br'er Bear are last seen narrowly escaping the jaws of Br'er Gator.

Two differences in the attraction's plot compared to the film are the exclusion of the Uncle Remus character as a storytelling device (although quotes from Uncle Remus are displayed in the attraction queue, and he is replaced by Br'er Frog as a narrator in Tokyo Disneyland) and changing Br'er Rabbit's method of capture from being stuck in tar to being stuck in a beehive.

History
Splash Mountain was originally conceived in the summer of 1983 by Imagineer Tony Baxter while stuck in rush-hour traffic on his way to work. He wanted to attract guests to the often-empty Bear Country land in Disneyland, with the only attraction as the Country Bear Jamboree (which later closed in 2001), plus a souvenir shop, and make use of the Audio-Animatronics figures from the Disneyland attraction America Sings, which was also poorly attended. It was Dick Nunis (then-president of Walt Disney attractions) who insisted that the Imagineers create a log flume for Disneyland, but the Imagineers were initially unenthusiastic about it, feeling that log flumes were too ordinary a theme park attraction to include in a Disney park. While trying to solve the problems of including a log flume, bringing people into Bear Country and reusing the America Sings figures, Baxter thought of Song of the South.

Baxter and his team developed the concept of Zip-a-Dee River Run, which would incorporate scenes from Song of the South. The name was later changed to Splash Mountain after then-CEO Michael Eisner's suggestion that the attraction be used to help market Walt Disney Studios' 1984 film Splash. The character figures from America Sings were used in many scenes, though all of the Br'er Rabbit, Br'er Fox, and Br'er Bear figures were specifically designed for Splash Mountain.

Plans to build the ride were unveiled in January 1987. At the time of its unveiling, Disney officials stated they would not be expecting criticism for its Song of the South theming due to the ride only including the film's animated characters. Construction began at Disneyland in April of that year. By that time, Splash Mountain, whose budget had risen greatly to $75 million, had become one of the most expensive projects created by Walt Disney Imagineering. The entire park cost around $17 million to build in 1955, which translates to around $80 million in 1987. According to Alice Davis (wife of Disney animator and Imagineer Marc Davis), when America Sings closed in April 1988, production of Disneyland's Splash Mountain had gone far over budget. The only way to recover was to close down America Sings and use the characters from that attraction.

Splash Mountain was originally planned to open in January 1989, but this was delayed to mid-February due to technical issues. The ride's opening was delayed again, to mid-July, due to boat problems. Test riders made up of company executives were getting soaked rather than lightly sprayed, so the boats were re-designed to be lighter, hold up to seven passengers instead of eight, and have an underwater scoop to keep too much water from leaking in.

Splash Mountain opened in Disneyland on July 17, 1989. To celebrate the opening, a television special was made called Ernest Goes to Splash Mountain. Actor and comedian Jim Varney returned to play the title role of Ernest in the special. Plans to install a camera that took photos of guests as they went down the final drop were unveiled in November 1990.

On January 14, 1990, Disney announced that Splash Mountain would be added to Walt Disney World's Magic Kingdom. In 1991, construction began for the attraction at Magic Kingdom and Tokyo Disneyland. On July 17, 1992, soft openings began at Magic Kingdom. The two versions of Splash Mountain officially opened within a day of each other in October 1992: the Tokyo Disneyland attraction opened on October 1, and the Magic Kingdom attraction opened on October 2. As Tokyo Disneyland and Magic Kingdom never had an America Sings attraction, all of the animatronic figures were created specifically for their respective versions of Splash Mountain, similar in design to the Disneyland figures. 

In the late 1990s, the attraction at Disneyland received the nickname "Flash Mountain", as some female riders would briefly expose their breasts during the descent, hoping to make illicit use of the in-ride photographs that Disney later sells to ride patrons.

In January 2011, the Magic Kingdom location received lap bars for its ride vehicles. Each row of two to three passengers shares one lap bar. Meanwhile, Tokyo Disneyland received individual lap bars, which makes the height restriction 5 inches shorter than the other two versions.

During the 2018 season, the Magic Kingdom location received a new sponsorship by Ziploc. The company created custom plastic bags to protect belongings for guests who rode the attraction.

In June 2020, it was announced that the Disneyland and Magic Kingdom attractions would be re-themed based on the 2009 film The Princess and the Frog. Disney stated that the development of the project began in 2019, prior to the online petitions that were circulated during the George Floyd protests. The New York Times reported that Disney executives had privately discussed removing the attraction's Song of the South theme for at least five years, before putting into development a theme based on The Princess and the Frog. The project will be led by Walt Disney Imagineer Senior Creative Producer Charita Carter with Baxter returning as a creative advisor. A spokeswoman said that there are no plans to redesign the attraction at Tokyo Disneyland, although The Oriental Land Company, which operates Tokyo Disney Resort, is currently engaged in discussions on whether or not to change the attraction. In August 2021, Vice President of Magic Kingdom Melissa Valiquette stated that due to the slow process of redesigning the ride, it was "going to be a little bit of time to reimagine Splash Mountain." During that month, new artwork and details for the retheme were revealed. In July 2022, during the ESSENCE festival in New Orleans, it was announced that the new ride, Tiana's Bayou Adventure, will open at both parks in late 2024. In December 2022, new artwork was unveiled and it was announced that the Magic Kingdom version of Splash Mountain would close on January 23, 2023.

From July 1 to August 31, 2022, Splash Mountain at Tokyo Disneyland became Splash Mountain "Get Wet MAX" during which guests got more soaked than usual to get relief from the extremely hot and humid Tokyo summers.

Attraction
Both versions of the ride feature the same scenes and a similar layout. The hollow tree stump on top of Splash Mountain is modeled after the exterior of Br'er Fox's lair in Song of the South and is called Chickapin Hill. The story of the ride "Br'er Rabbit Leaves Home" is told in the dark ride segment on the meandering river. The flume converts to a roller coaster-style track in complete darkness to transition to "The Laughing Place" caverns. After Br'er Rabbit is captured, the logs ascend up the attraction's predominant hill into the "Tar-Baby" segment (although in the attraction the tar baby is replaced with a hive of bees). Br'er Rabbit, now captured by Br'er Fox, tricks the villain into throwing him into the briar patch; the drop itself mimics Br'er Rabbit's fall. The log descends a fifty-six-foot drop into a briar patch before continuing back into the mountain, where numerous audio-animatronic animals sing a chorus of "Zip-a-Dee-Doo-Dah."

Disneyland

Guests enter the queue in front the main drop viewing area. The queue winds past the Critter Country sign into the main entrance where a number of machines with cogs and gears dominate. Various thoughts and sayings from Uncle Remus are featured on signs throughout the queue, which winds around a barn structure and reaches the loading area.

Passengers ride aboard six-to-seven-seater logs with six single-file seats. The last seat in each log is larger and allows room for larger guests or an adult and a small child, overall increasing the capacity to be seven in each log. The log departs the loading area and ascends two conveyor-type lifts before floating gently through scenery designed to evoke the feeling of a river in the southern state of Georgia. The homes of the three main characters and aged farm equipment are incorporated into the landscape, along with an instrumental version of "How Do You Do?" emanating from hidden speakers along the waterway.

Before the logs enter the indoor portion, snoring is heard emanating from Br'er Bear's cave. The snoring is a tribute to the original entrance to Bear Country (the former name of Critter Country) where a bear named Rufus was heard snoring from a cave.

After a short drop down "Slippin' Falls", guests enter the indoor portion of the attraction, where various Audio-Animatronic animals, such as geese, frogs, and opossums sing the attraction's first musical number, "How Do You Do?". After rounding a corner, riders see Br'er Bear caught in a trap while Br'er Fox berates him and tells him "We gotta catch that Br'er Rabbit!". Br'er Rabbit, seen outside his Briar Patch, tells Br'er Turtle that he is leaving home in search of adventure, and is heading for his Laughin' Place. Br'er Bear follows him only for the "Laughin' Place" to actually be a trick, and Br'er Bear winds up being attacked by bees as Br'er Rabbit laughs at the sight. Riders progress through the surreal Rainbow Caverns, where characters sing "Everybody's Got a Laughin' Place".

Br'er Fox then manages to trap Br'er Rabbit in a beehive. The mood turns ominous as two mother characters (an opossum and rabbit) sing the "Burrow's Lament." At the base of the final lift hill, two vultures bear ominous warnings for the riders. The logs begin the final ascent and shortly before the attraction's climactic drop, Br'er Rabbit is seen alongside the hill, about to be eaten by Br'er Fox, but Br'er Rabbit outsmarts Br'er Fox and Br'er Bear by tricking them into throwing him into the briar patch (where he was born and raised). Riders are sent down the final drop into the briar patch, mimicking his fall. The top half of the drop is highly visible from the adjacent areas of the park. An on-ride photo is taken as the log begins to fall, and it can be purchased after disembarking from the ride. From the top of the hill, riders looking toward the splashdown point will notice a full pond of water ahead of them.

The log then 'dives' under the water into an underground runout. The collective weight of the riders generally determines the degree to which they get wet here. An indoor segment follows the drop, after which the logs make a final entrance into a section of the mountain named "Doo-Dah Landing", where a full cast of Audio-Animatronic figures sing "Zip-a-Dee-Doo-Dah" and the respective fates of Br'er Rabbit (reclined happily at home) and the antagonists (fending off a hungry Br'er Gator) are seen. As the log passes through the Doo-Dah Landing room, a series of glass windows can be seen near the ceiling, behind which is a tunnel used by the Disneyland Railroad track.

Before the return to the loading area, riders are given a preview of their picture that was taken on the final drop via an overhead screen. Professor Barnaby Owl, an overhead Audio-Animatronic, calls the riders' attention to the screen as he remarks on their expressions. After disembarking from the log, riders enter a "dark room," where they preview their on-ride photograph before exiting back out into Critter Country.

Tokyo Disneyland

Splash Mountain at Tokyo Disneyland is very similar to the Florida version of the ride, with a few exceptions. The ride's layout is a mirror image of Florida's owing to the attraction's location on the opposite side of the river. The secondary characters are altogether different and the show scenes are in different orders. The Tokyo version also lacks a mill or barn-like structure on the second lift (although it is used as the main entrance to the ride queue). Instead, the logs venture into a cave-like opening to begin the second ascent. Another difference from the Florida version is that the Slippin' Falls drop takes place in a dark cave, making the final drop the only outdoor one. The Tokyo version does not have an extra drop after the biggest drop while the Florida version did.

Magic Kingdom

Without a Critter Country section in Magic Kingdom, Splash Mountain was instead located in Frontierland, next to Big Thunder Mountain Railroad. Construction of Splash Mountain necessitated the demolition of the existing railroad station and temporarily turning the railroad into a shuttle system between the Main Street, U.S.A. and Mickey's Toontown Fair sections.

Riders boarded eight-passenger logs, seated two by two, unlike Disneyland where they seat one by one. Sometimes, a third rider (usually a small child) could be seated in between two guests in a row. Logs were equipped with lap bars following a January 2011 renovation. The log departed the loading area, where Br'er Frog provided introductory narration. The log ascended a dual-chain lift that deposited riders in a small pond at the bottom of the big drop. After a right turn, logs entered the barn and climbed another lift to the space behind the visible mountain, before floating gently through scenery designed to evoke the feeling of a river in the Southern United States, particularly Georgia, where Song of the South was based. The homes of the three main characters, aged farm equipment, stagecoach wagons, and ale barrels were incorporated into the landscape, along with a country instrumental version of "How Do You Do?" that emanated from hidden speakers along the waterway. After passing Br'er Bear's cave, the logs descended down the Slippin' Falls drop and crossed back under the flume. The logs then entered the show building containing the indoor portion of the attraction, where various Audio-Animatronic animals including geese and frogs sang the attraction's first musical number, "How Do You Do?". Several vignettes established the story of a restless Br'er Rabbit leaving home and being pursued by Br'er Fox and Br'er Bear.

Br'er Fox and Br'er Bear saw Br'er Rabbit telling Mr. Bluebird that he was going to his Laughing Place. Br'er Porcupine warned him of the danger ahead, but Br'er Rabbit continued on. "Everybody's Got a Laughing Place" began to play after Br'er Bear sprang Br'er Fox's rabbit trap. The logs continued onward past a roadrunner who asked to be taken along to the Laughin' Place, while opossums sang the song from overhead. The logs reached a dark tunnel followed by a "dip-drop" into the Laughin' Place. Bees attacked Br'er Bear while Br'er Rabbit laughed with joy, unaware that Br'er Fox was behind him, preparing to drop a beehive on top of him. The logs then went over another short drop, and headed further into the cavern scenes. There, geyser-riding turtles and laughing, singing bullfrogs, and dancing water fountains guided the log to a dark area in which Br'er Rabbit was caught by Br'er Fox in a cave of stalactites and stalagmites. Two vultures (this time wearing top hats) taunted riders as they began their ascent up the final lift. A scene to the left side of the flume showed Br'er Fox menacing Br'er Rabbit, with Bre'r Rabbit pleading not to be thrown into the briar patch.

At the top of this third lift hill, the log descended the  drop at a 45-degree angle, reached a maximum speed of 40 mph, into a tunnel underneath the Frontierland walkway. After another outdoor flume segment, the log coasted back into the mountain, where critters at "Doo Dah Landing" were singing "Zip-a-Dee-Doo-Dah" in celebration of Br'er Rabbit's return, while Br'er Fox and Br'er Bear attempted to fend off Br'er Gator. At the end, Br'er Rabbit sang with Mr. Bluebird, telling him that he learned his lesson.

After exiting the log, riders could tap their cards or MagicBands to save their ride photo.

Soundtrack

Disneyland
Splash Mountain at Disneyland features music in a jazzy "big band" meets orchestral style, fitting the attraction's proximity to New Orleans Square.

 "How Do You Do?" - Recorded specially for the ride in 1988 by The Floozies, a 29-piece band from Oregon. The backing track of 'Bom, bom, bom, bom...' that can be heard coming from the bullfrogs in accompaniment to the lyrics sung by the Geese was sung by 13 of the 29 members. Walter Steven "Sim" Hurgle (b. 1963) is the band's lead vocalist, and his voice can be heard singing most of the words, while his fellow band members provide harmony and backing vocals. One of the bullfrogs is voiced by veteran voice actor Thurl Ravenscroft.
 "Ev'rybody Has a Laughing Place" and "Burrow's Lament" - These songs are sung by Elisa, Georgia and Castell Newton, three sisters from California who worked for The Walt Disney Company at the time of the ride's construction. Castell and Elisa sing the words, while Georgia was responsible for the high-pitched, operatic 'ahh's' in the background, which were removed upon the song changing from "Sooner or Later" to "Burrow's Lament". Burrow's Lament is mainly sung by BJ Ward. The vultures above the third lift hill are voiced by Jess Harnell.
 "Zip-a-Dee-Doo-Dah" - A choir consisting of over 75 cast members was used to record this last score, recorded in the company's Burbank studios in 1987. Harnell sings a solo as Br'er Rabbit as the logs take their final turn back into the station.

In addition, several other songs from Song of the South are heard as instrumental tracks, playing on a loop near the attraction and in the queuing area. These include "That's What Uncle Remus Said", "Sooner or Later", "All I Want", "Who Wants to Live Like That", and "Let the Rain Pour Down." The loop only features songs from the film and lasts about 25 minutes.

Animators took over 80 hours to synchronize each figure. To re-wire and test each figure took an additional three months before the attraction could open, as programmers were tasked with reprogramming the figures from their previous America Sings performances with a decent level of realism in accordance with the new settings. Each character can carry out 45 seconds of movement and dialogue before a loop function restarts the sequence from the beginning.

Tokyo Disneyland
Like in Florida, the main melodies consist of banjos, fiddles and harmonicas. The vocals, however, are completely different from the Magic Kingdom attraction, with the specific verses sung within the show scenes arranged in different orders and the choruses and back-up vocals arranged with different harmonies. Additionally, dialogue and lyrics in Tokyo are Japanese for "How Do You Do?" and "Zip-a-Dee-Doo-Dah", but English for "Ev'rybody's Got a Laughin' Place". In both instances, "Burrow's Lament" is heard as an instrumental track with timpani drums (a take that was originally recorded for Disneyland, but never used), with dramatic orchestra and choir.

Magic Kingdom
The ride featured the same songs heard at the Disneyland attraction, which are variations of the three songs found in the animated segments from Song of the South, though the attraction did not present these songs in the same order as the film. Because of the ride's location in Frontierland, the soundtrack featured a country feel, with banjos and harmonicas as the primary instruments, and also because of Florida's proximity to Georgia, where Song of the South is set. "Burrow's Lament" was the only exception, using an orchestral track with timpani drums originally recorded for the Disneyland version.

In the order heard in the attraction's ride-through segments:

 "How Do You Do?"
 "Ev'rybody's Got a Laughin' Place"
 "Zip-a-Dee-Doo-Dah"

Songs from the film heard as instrumental tracks in the queuing area included "That's What Uncle Remus Said", "Let the Rain Pour Down", "Sooner or Later", and the opening theme from the film. Traditional songs like "Old MacDonald Had a Farm" and "Goober Peas" were also played in a bluegrass style. The loop lasted about an hour, and included different orchestrations of the three main songs heard in the ride as well.

Music releases
Despite being released on CDs attributed to the Magic Kingdom or Walt Disney World in general, as well as often bearing specific track attribution (such as "from Walt Disney World's Splash Mountain"), the country-western style soundtrack actually found at the Florida and Tokyo parks has at least managed to surface on the 2003 Walt Disney World CD entitled "The Official Album/Where Magic Lives". Banjos are heard for over halfway through the 7:57 length, as well as at the end. It is a very different musical arrangement when compared to many other "Walt Disney World", "Disneyland", or combination "Walt Disney World/Disneyland" CDs labeled as "The Official Album". The Disneyland ride does not incorporate this particular country-western-themed soundtrack. Fan-credited versions of the country-western version from the Magic Kingdom have also surfaced as MP3 downloads online. Tokyo Disneyland versions have surfaced also, but have been harder to locate.

Voice cast
 Br'er Rabbit,  Mr. Bluebird, Geese, Boothill Boys, Br'er Terrapin: Jess Harnell
 Br'er Fox: J. D. Hall
 Br'er Bear: Nick Stewart and Jess Harnell (some lines) (Disneyland version)/James Avery (Magic Kingdom version)
 Br'er Frog: James Avery
 Bullfrogs: Thurl Ravenscroft
 Mother Possum, Mother Rabbit: B. J. Ward

See also

List of Disneyland attractions
List of Magic Kingdom attractions
List of Tokyo Disneyland attractions
Incidents at Walt Disney World Resort
List of Disney attractions using Audio-Animatronics

References

External links
Disneyland Splash Mountain
Tokyo Disneyland Splash Mountain
  – Patent for reduced splash logs used in Tokyo.
Disneyland Splash Mountain construction photos

Amusement rides introduced in 1989
Amusement rides introduced in 1992
Walt Disney Parks and Resorts attractions
Former Walt Disney Parks and Resorts attractions 
Disneyland
Magic Kingdom
Tokyo Disneyland
Dark rides
Frontierland
Critter Country
Audio-Animatronic attractions
Water rides manufactured by Hopkins Rides
Western (genre) amusement rides
1989 establishments in California
1992 establishments in Florida
1992 establishments in Japan
Amusement rides that closed in 2023
2023 disestablishments in Florida
Fictional places in Disney films
Br'er Rabbit
Disney controversies
African-American-related controversies
Race-related controversies